Monterosso railway station (Stazione di Monterosso) is located on the Genoa–Pisa railway, Italy. It serves Monterosso al Mare, which is one of the five towns of the Cinque Terre.

History
The station was inaugurated on 24 October 1874, at the same time as the – line.
 
On 11 March 1918, the year in which the station was enlarged, an extension of the crossing loop was activated and, at the same time, a special cabin was installed at the new station to centralise the control of the signals.
 
The doubling towards , the last section of the line to remain single track, was not completed until 23 January 1970. It was in fact a particularly complex project, given the need to operate without interrupting operations on the line and the need to manage water flows above the line. The construction of a building to accommodate six staff dates back to this period.
 
In June and July 2011, the station was also served by the Treni del Mare ("trains of the sea") managed by the private company Arenaways, which became bankrupt shortly afterwards.

Buildings and infrastructure 
Inside the station building, which is built on two levels, there are various services such as a ticket office, a bar and a waiting room.
 
Monterosso has three platforms for passenger services. Due to its particular position close to the mountains, the station is located between three tunnels, which is why the foot paths are partly in the tunnel and partly outside. Platforms 1 and 3 are normally used, while platform 2 is used only to allow overtaking or for the terminus of some special services.
 
The freight yard is currently closed.

Services 
The station, which RFI manages and classified in 2008 in the silver category, has:
  ticket counter 
  ticket machines
  bar
  toilets.

Rail services
The station is served by Trenitalia regional services operated under a contract with the region of Liguria.

References

Footnotes

Sources
 
 
 
 
 
 
 

Railway stations in Liguria
Railway stations opened in 1874